Judith Margaret Bailey (born 18 July 1941) is an English clarinettist, composer and conductor.  She was born in Camborne, Cornwall, and studied at the Royal Academy of Music from 1959–63, and. Since 1971 she has been working as a composer and conductor. She conducted the Southampton Concert Orchestra and Petersfield Orchestra for almost 30 years before returning to her native Cornwall around 2001 where she has been conducting for the Cornwall Chamber Orchestra and the Penzance Orchestral Society.

She is a Cornish composer; in 2001 she was honoured as an "Associate of the Royal Academy of Music" for showing distinction amongst her peers and in 2005 as a Bard of the Gorsedh Kernow for her contributions to music in Cornwall. She is a member of the Composers' Guild of Great Britain, the Cornish Music Guild, as well as a Trustee for the Cornwall Music Service Trust.

Selected works
Trencrom, symphonic poem, 1978
Symphony, 1981
Symphony, 1982
Seascape, for women's chorus, woodwind trio and orchestra, 1985
Penwith, overture, 1986
Fiesta for orchestra, 1988
Concerto for clarinet and strings, 1988
Havas for orchestra, 1991
Joplinesque for wind band
Festive Concert Piece for wind band
A widow bird (in Three Settings of Poems by Shelley) (Text: Percy Bysshe Shelley)
Music (in Three Settings of Poems by Shelley) (Text: Percy Bysshe Shelley)
Neap-Tide (Text: Algernon Charles Swinburne)
To the moon (in Three Settings of Poems by Shelley) (Text: Percy Bysshe Shelley)

References

External links

1941 births
Living people
20th-century classical composers
British women classical composers
English classical composers
People from Camborne
20th-century English composers
20th-century English women musicians
Musicians from Cornwall
20th-century women composers